Union Hill is a historic neighborhood in Kansas City, Missouri. The neighborhood is located between 27th Street and 31st Street and Main Street to Gillham Road.

The Founders at Union Hill, a  mixed-use, luxury urban development, is located north/south from 27th Terrace to 31st Street and west/east from Oak Street to Gillham Road. It is closer to Crown Center than the neighborhood itself.

A short walk from the Crossroads Arts District, Union Hill preserves history and embraces the future of Kansas City with the Kauffman Performing Arts Center, downtown Kansas City and Country Club Plaza as nearby neighbors.

References
 Union Hill Website

Neighborhoods in Kansas City, Missouri
Kansas City metropolitan area
History of Kansas City, Missouri